The Chobe Regional Football Association Division One League, also known as the CHORFA Division One, is one of the regional leagues that make up the third tier of Botswana football. It is administered by the Chobe Regional Football Association and features teams from Chobe region.

Past seasons

References

Football leagues in Botswana